Hackley School is a private college preparatory school located in Tarrytown, New York, and is a member of the Ivy Preparatory School League. Founded in 1899 by a wealthy philanthropist,  Frances Hackley, Hackley was intended to be a Unitarian alternative to the mostly Episcopal boarding schools throughout the Northeast. Since its founding, Hackley has dropped its Unitarian affiliations and changed from all-boys to coeducational. Hackley is divided into three schools on the same campus: the Lower School, the Middle School, and the Upper School. Hackley school is also a member of the global education association Round Square.

In September 2015, Hackley announced the appointment of Michael C. Wirtz as Hackley's 12th head of school. Wirtz began his tenure July 1, 2016, succeeding Walter C. Johnson, who served as headmaster from 1995 to 2016.

History

Founding
During the 1890s, the American Unitarian leadership in Boston became increasingly concerned about the lack of Unitarian presence in secondary and college preparatory education. Unitarians controlled Harvard University; its president, Charles Eliot, was the leading lay-person in the Unitarian movement, and the faculty included numerous Unitarians.

Frances Hackley, a wealthy widow and leading supporter of the Unitarian movement, decided to give her summer mansion in Tarrytown to a charity. She resided in New York City, and was a member of the Church of the Messiah. Hackley was friends with the church's minister, who proposed using the mansion as a school for boys. In the winter of 1898–1899, she met with Samuel Eliot of Boston, who later became the president of the American Unitarian Association, and several other prominent Unitarians. Hackley liked the idea of a college preparatory school to serve the Unitarian community and any families interested in a liberal religious environment and wanted to use her home for this purpose. She provided substantial funding to refurbish the mansion for school purposes and to operate the school for several years. In the spring of 1899, a board of trustees was formed and very shortly thereafter it selected its first headmaster. The first students arrived in the autumn of 1899 and resided in the Hackley home, today called Hackley Hall. Hackley School celebrates Frances Hackley's birthday, October 27, as "Founders Day" to this day.

Expansion
The home and grounds quickly proved inadequate to support a preparatory school. In the fall of 1899, Theodore Chickering Williams and Seaver Buck, the first headmaster and the first master hired, respectively, searched for additional land. They found a large estate for sale near the grounds of what later became Marymount College, and purchased it with funds from Hackley. The buildings on the estate were torn down immediately, and within a short period, construction began on the buildings that would eventually join to form the Hackley quadrangle. The first buildings constructed were Goodhue Hall and the Minot Savage building. They were in use for the first time in 1902–1903. The remaining buildings, including the Sarah Goodhue King Chapel and the Headmaster's house, were completed by 1908. The architectural firm of Wheelwright and Haven designed the new school buildings and Downing Vaux provided contouring and plans for the first playing field and track.

Theodore Chickering Williams helped plan the school buildings and the curriculum and style of education. He had been a Unitarian minister in New York and was recognized as an important classical scholar. From the beginning Hackley was non-sectarian, shaped by Unitarian values, and it welcomed students from all faiths. A vigorous interscholastic sports program began during the first years with football already at the center of action in 1900–1901.

Hackley Hall, Frances Hackley's mansion, became the lower school and was eventually sold. It no longer exists, although one can find on the Marymount campus old stone gates which provided the entrance to the Hackley home. Throughout Hackley's history there have been twelve headmasters and three acting headmasters. Inscribed above one of Hackley's doors is the phrase "Enter Here to Be and Find a Friend."

Destruction of Goodhue Memorial Hall
On August 4, 2007, a fire, sparked by an intense lightning storm, destroyed Goodhue Memorial Hall. The Kaskel Library and its 27,000 volumes, artwork, and non-book resources (CDs, DVDs, videos, magazines) were lost. While the fire gutted the roof and interiors, the stone facade of the building remained intact.

During the rebuilding of Goodhue, the Middle/Upper School Library was located in King Memorial Chapel; the Lower School Library opened in 2007 in the Santomero Library on the second floor of the Kathleen Allen Lower School.

In September 2010, Goodhue Memorial Hall reopened, with the Sternberg Library and computer labs located on the new second floor. Classrooms, faculty offices, a student lounge, and a multi-media room occupy the first floor.

Academics 
To earn a high school diploma, students in grades 9-12 must complete 4 years of English; up to the 3rd level of a language (Hackley offers French, Spanish, Chinese, or Latin, with additional elective classes in Greek); 3 years of the required history sequence that includes History 9: Cultures in Conflict, US History to 1900 and 20th Century World History; mathematics through Algebra II and Trigonometry; 3 years of science that must include Physics, Chemistry, and Biology (Hackley is part of the Physics First program); 1 year of performing or visual arts; and 1 year of Health in sophomore year. Hackley offers classes at and beyond the AP level in many of these subjects.

Additional courses and electives are offered, including Creative Writing, History of Western Theater, Seminar in Moral Philosophy, Economics, History of Media & Culture, Art History, Calculus, Finite Mathematics, Statistics, Organic Chemistry, Marine Biology, Ecology, Etymology, Computer Science, Electronic Publishing, Studio Art, Three-Dimensional Sculpture and Design, Architecture and Design, Ceramics, Photography, Filmmaking, Music Theory, Seminar in Music Listening, Acting, Seminar in (music) Composition, and Opera and Jazz, and Student Teaching (where high school students assist in lower school classes).

Upper School (9-12) students who are not enrolled in a sport take part in Physical Education classes offered each semester after school, twice a week. These courses take place after school and serve as a way to wind down and relax after the school day, in addition to teaching Hackley students how to live a healthy lifestyle. The Physical Education program offers varied activities in fitness, lifetime, and group sports as well as outdoor education, including Kayaking, Squash, Rock Climbing, Pilates, and Yoga.

The Music Institute 
The Music Institute at Hackley School represents a partnership between professional musicians of the area, Hackley School, and the Hackley community. The institute offers both group and one-on-one lessons in all instruments, drama, and voice – and at all levels. Lessons are taught on Hackley's campus and can be arranged during the school day or after school – depending upon each student's schedule.

Interscholastic sports 
Hackley School is a part of the Ivy Preparatory School League. The Boys' Soccer team won the Ivy League title in 2010 after going 13–1 in league play and earned the number one seed in the 2010 NYSAISAA State Tournament. The Girls' Cross Country, Boys' Épée Fencing, Girls' Épée Fencing, and Boys' Swimming teams were all Ivy League Champions in the 2011–2012 season. In 2012, the Girls' Basketball team won the Ivy League and the NYSAISAA State Championship, going undefeated for the first time in school history. The Girls' Lacrosse team also won the Ivy League and the NYSAISAA State Championship in 2012, finishing the season with a record of 18-1 and unbeaten in Ivy League play. The Boys' Lacrosse team has equalled the success of the Girls' Lacrosse team, having reached the NYSAISAA State Championship in each of the last three seasons. The Boys' Lacrosse team won their first ever NYSAISAA State Championship in 2012, finishing the season with a record of 18-1 and as unbeaten Ivy League Champions. The Boys' Track and Field team won both the Ivy League and the NYSAISAA State Championship in 2012, making them the four-time, consecutive, defending Ivy League and NYSAISAA State Champions. The Boys' Squash team won its first Ivy League title in 2016, and won its second ever title the following year in 2017 after going a perfect 10–0 in league play and 18-0 overall. In 2017, the Boys' Squash team also qualified for Division I at High-School Nationals, as one of the top 16 teams in the country, going up against schools such as Deerfield Academy. The Boys' Golf team also won back-to-back Ivy League titles in 2016 and 2017, as well as their first ever NYSAISAA State Championship in 2017.

Boarding program
The Upper School's five-day boarding program provides a combination of school and academic concentration during the week coupled with family and home life on the weekends. The program houses up to 30 students of all genders.

The small community of boarding students lives in boys and girls wings that share common lounges and study halls. Students are directly advised by six faculty members who live on the boarding corridor.

Notable people

Alumni
Notable alumni include:
 Alan Seeger 1906, poet
 F. O. Matthiessen 1919, Rhodes Scholar, Harvard Professor
 Philip Johnson 1923, architect
 Frederick R. Koch 1951, billionaire collector and philanthropist
 George Hamilton 1957, actor
 Claude Canizares, 1963, astrophysicist (Chandra X-Ray Observatory)
 Malcolm Mooney 1964, musician (notably Can's original singer) and visual artist 
 Joe Klein 1964, author (Primary Colors)
 Jim Reilly 1966, former NFL football player
 Alec Wilkinson 1970 author The Happiest Man in the World
 Chris Berman 1973, ESPN sportscaster
 Keith Olbermann 1975, newscaster
 Ilyasah Shabazz 1979, author (Growing Up X)
 Ken Noda 1980 pianist, vocal coach, and composer
 Andrew Jarecki 1981, documentary filmmaker, Capturing the Friedmans
 Cathy Schulman 1983, producer of Academy Award winner for Best Picture, Crash
 Eric Bress 1987 filmmaker, The Butterfly Effect (2004), Kyle XY (2006–2009
 Dara Khosrowshahi 1987, chief executive officer of Uber
 Eugene Jarecki 1987, documentary filmmaker, Why We Fight
 Ian Rapoport 1998, reporter NFL Network
 Jordan Rapp 1998, Triathlete (2011 ITU long-distance world champion)
 Jenifer Rajkumar 2000, politician
 Avery Trufelman 2009, radio journalist and podcaster
 Andrew Stopera 2015, national team curler
Celia Rose Gooding 2018, actress and singer

Hackley in media
Brooks Brothers and Polo Ralph Lauren have both done catalogue shoots on Hackley's campus.
 Hackley's campus was featured in the movies Presumed Innocent, Admission, and Tales from the Darkside: The Movie.

References

External links
 
 Private School Review

Tarrytown, New York
Preparatory schools in New York (state)
Educational institutions established in 1899
Boarding schools in New York (state)
Private K-12 schools in Westchester County, New York
Unitarian Universalism in New York (state)
1899 establishments in New York (state)
Ivy Preparatory School League